Asperula rupicola is a species of flowering plant in the coffee family Rubiaceae. It was first described in 1852 and is endemic to France and Italy.

References 

rupicola
Flora of France
Flora of Italy